Thomas 'Tom' Mark Paul Barnard (born November 7, 1951) is an American talk radio host and former voice-over talent. He retired as the host of The KQ92 Morning Show on 92 KQRS but currently hosts Tom Barnard Show on 105 The Ticket from 6:00pm to 7:00pm both broadcast in the Minneapolis-St. Paul area.  The show on 105 The Ticket makes up the third hour of The Tom Barnard Podcast known as "The Ticket" where the first two hours of the podcast is known as "The Show". As of February, 2014, the podcast was no longer broadcast on 105 The Ticket

Personal

Barnard was born in Long Prairie, Minnesota and raised in North Minneapolis. He and his wife Kathryn Brandt live in Edina, Minnesota.

Career
Before coming to KQRS, Barnard worked at numerous stations including WDGY and KSTP (as "The Catman"). Until 1986, he was the booth announcer for KSTP-TV.

Barnard, and then-partner Dan Culhane, started the "Tom and Dan" show in 1986 featuring sports reports from WCCO-TV sports anchor Mark Rosen. At one point, the team of Barnard and Culhane spearheaded a  write-in campaign to elect Rosen For Governor of Minnesota. Culhane  was eventually pushed out of the broadcast in a personnel move,  while Rosen was "persuaded" by WCCO TV's parent company to move his morning sports to WCCO-AM.

Barnard gave an in-depth interview to the St. Paul Pioneer Press in which he discussed his strained relationship with his deceased father and compared his radio persona to that of his actual personality. Earlier in his career, Barnard and Culhane were guests with two other Twin Cities radio show duos on a local morning television show in 1988.

Although he is semi-retired from voice-over work, Barnard can currently be heard in radio ads for Home Depot. For many years Barnard's voice was heard in various markets, introducing shows and appearing on commercials.

On September 29, 2009's Morning Show wrap-up, Barnard casually mentioned that he's planning to retire from live radio on December 21, 2012. Tom specifically said Terri would take over the Morning show, moments later the discussion moved to a "play off" for host during the year 2012. Tom explained that the 21st is a Friday and it's just before Christmas.

On March 29, 2013, Barnard announced on the air that he would be entering treatment for issues in regard to anger, not substance abuse as previously reported.

In February 2020, Barnard and Cumulus Media announced Barnard had signed an 8 year extension to remain at KQRS until 2028, when he will be 76 years old. In a recent interview with KSTP-TV he has announced his retirement. His final show was December 23, 2022.

Controversy
Barnard has long prided himself on what he refers to as his "insensitive" humor, notably in 1998 when, while working for KQRS, he made racist statements on-air following an influx in Hmong refugee immigration to the Twin Cities and subsequently declared Hmong immigrants should "assimilate or hit the goddamn road." After receiving criticism for his statements, Barnard responded on-air on October 20, 1998: “I will attack who I want to attack.” Following Barnard's remarks, Hmong activists formed Community Action Against Racism (CAAR), a "multiracial coalition of whites, Latinos, and Asian and African Americans", which organized and drew attention to the issue. CAAR demanded an apology and "successfully organized an economic boycott of the station." While KQRS issued an apology, many in the Twin Cities still call for Barnard's termination as Barnard has continued to make offensive and derogatory statements about "Somalis, African Americans, Mexican Americans and Native Americans" on air.

Awards

Barnard won the 2006 Marconi award for Large Market Personality of the Year.

Barnard was inducted into the radio Hall of Fame in 2017, and the Minnesota Broadcasters Hall of Fame  in 2018.

The Marconi awards recognize excellence in radio broadcasting.

References

External links 
KQRS Morning Show (official site)
Radiotapes.com Aircheck samples of Tom Barnard's radio career including WDGY-AM as "Catman," KQRS "Cat and Kincaid" and additional current airchecks from the KQRS Morning Show.
Star Tribune Profile of Tom Barnard from the Minneapolis Star Tribune, March 10, 2010.
Tom Barnard Podcast (official site)

1951 births
Living people
People from Long Prairie, Minnesota
American talk radio hosts
Radio personalities from Minneapolis